Darsberg is a small village next to and part of Neckarsteinach. The place is famous for its carnival tradition of rolling a firewheel down a hill.

Villages in Hesse